| tries = {{#expr:
 + 7 + 5 + 12 + 12 + 8 + 6
 + 5 + 6 + 5 + 4 + 1 + 4
 + 4 + 6 + 6 + 4 + 3 + 4
 + 5 + 9 + 6 + 7 + 7 + 9
 + 6 + 3 + 9 + 3 + 7 + 1
 + 9 + 6 + 8 + 8 + 6 + 7
 + 1 + 6 + 11 + 7 + 4 + 5
 + 3 + 6 + 7 + 6 + 8 + 3
 + 5 + 6 + 8 + 4 + 4 + 4
 + 6 + 3 + 10 + 7 + 7 + 4
 + 3 + 2 + 6 + 4 + 10 + 4
 + 9 + 3 + 3 + 10 + 10 + 4
 + 9 + 5 + 6 + 7 + 6 + 7
 + 3 + 1 + 5 + 3 + 1 + 7
 + 6 + 1 + 6 + 5 + 5 + 2
 + 6 + 6 + 6 + 5 + 1 + 6
 + 6 + 7 + 3 + 3 + 5 + 6
 + 4 + 9 + 11 + 3 + 4 + 3
 + 7 + 5 + 10 + 5 + 4 + 6
 + 8 + 5 + 4 + 6 + 7 + 6
 + 5 + 7 + 8 + 8 + 8 + 8
 + 12 + 8 + 9 + 7 + 5 + 8
 + 9 + 4
 + 5
}}
| top point scorer = Owen Farrell (Saracens)(217 points)
| top try scorer = Josh Adams (Worcester),Vereniki Goneva (Newcastle),Christian Wade (Wasps)(13 tries)
| website    = www.premiershiprugby.com
| prevseason = 2016–17
| nextseason = 2018–19
}}

The 2017–18 Aviva Premiership was the 31st season of the top flight English domestic rugby union competition and the eighth and final one to be sponsored by Aviva. The reigning champions entering the season were Exeter Chiefs, who had claimed their first title after defeating Wasps in the 2017 final. London Irish had been promoted as champions from the 2016–17 RFU Championship at the first attempt.

Highlights of each weekend's games were shown on Channel 5 with extended highlights on BT Sport.

Summary
Saracens won their fourth title after defeating Exeter Chiefs in the final at Twickenham after having finished second in the regular season table. London Irish were relegated after being unable to win their penultimate game of the season. It was the third time that London Irish have been relegated from the top flight since the leagues began and the first time since the 2015–16 Premiership Rugby season.

As usual, round 1 included the London Double Header at Twickenham, the fourteenth instance since its inception in 2004.

Teams
Twelve teams compete in the league – the top eleven teams from the previous season and London Irish who were promoted from the 2016–17 RFU Championship after a top flight absence of one year. They replaced Bristol Bears who were relegated after one year in the top flight.

Stadiums and locations

Pre-season
The 2017 edition of the Singha Premiership Rugby Sevens was held on 28 and 29 July at Franklin's Gardens. For the first time all twelve Premiership teams featured together in one venue over two days. Teams were split into four pools of three which played each other in a round-robin basis with the tournament splitting into Cup, Plate and Bowl finals on the second day.

Table

Regular season
Fixtures for the season were announced by Premiership Rugby on 7 July 2017. As is the norm, round 1 included the London Double Header at Twickenham.
After success in 2016 a match would once again take place in the United States with Newcastle Falcons hosting Saracens at the Talen Energy Stadium in the Philadelphia suburb of Chester, Pennsylvania in round 3.

All fixtures are subject to change.

Round 1

Round 2

Round 3

Round 4

Round 5

Round 6

Round 7

Round 8

Round 9

Round 10

Round 11

Round 12

Round 13

Round 14

Round 15

Round 16

Round 17

Round 18

Round 19

Round 20

Round 21

London Irish are relegated following Worcester Warriors win against Harlequins.

Round 22

Play-offs
As in previous seasons, the top four teams in the Premiership table, following the conclusion of the regular season, contest the play-off semi-finals in a 1st vs 4th and 2nd vs 3rd format, with the higher ranking team having home advantage. The two winners of the semi-finals then meet in the Premiership Final at Twickenham on 26 May 2018.

Bracket

Semi-finals

Final

Leading scorers
Note: Flags indicate national union as has been defined under WR eligibility rules. Players may hold more than one non-WR nationality.

Most points

Source:

Most tries

Source:

Season attendances

By club

Source:

Highest attendances

Notes

References

External links
 

 
2017-18
 
England